Oysters are two small, round pieces of dark meat on the back of poultry near the thigh, in the hollow on the dorsal side of the ilium bone.

In French, this part of the bird is called sot-l'y-laisse which translates, roughly, to "the fool leaves it there", as unskilled carvers sometimes accidentally leave it on the skeleton. In French, the term has been democratized by its musicality for its variations around s and l, .

References

Chicken as food
Cuts of meat